Bryan Colin Strang (born 9 June 1972) is a former Zimbabwean international cricketer who played in 26 Test matches and 49 One Day Internationals between 1995 and 2001. His older brother Paul Strang also played international cricket for Zimbabwe.

Domestic career
In 2001, he helped bowl Matabeleland out for a national record low score in first-class cricket of 19 runs, taking 5 wickets for 6.

International career
Strang was a left-arm medium bowler and due to his nagging accuracy was hard to get away in ODI cricket. This earned him a career economy rate of 4.13. His best bowling figures in ODI cricket of 6 for 20, made against Bangladesh in 1997 are a Zimbabwean record.

He played his last game for Zimbabwe in July 2001 and in 2002 he moved to South Africa due to political unrest. He's become a vocal critic of Zimbabwean cricket and during the 2003 World Cup he stated that Zimbabwe should be barred from hosting World Cup matches on moral grounds. As a result, when he attempted a comeback in 2003–04 the Zimbabwean Cricket Union banned him.

Following the lifting of the ban in 2005 Strang made a comeback and was recalled for a training squad ahead of the New Zealand and India tours of Zimbabwe and played for Zimbabwe A against Pakistan A in 2006. However he was later informed by Zimbabwe Cricket that he services were no longer required.

Beyond cricket
In 2008 he received an honorary degree in Sports Sciences from the University of Newcastle upon Tyne, making him eligible for their crunch cricket match against the University of Edinburgh in July.

As the years have progressed he has really enjoyed his coaching and teaching. Since returning to Zimbabwe, he went into coaching at schools like Lilfordia School and St. George's College in Harare. He has done lots more coaching at many levels. He really enjoys giving back to the kids of his country in any sport and would like to see them get the best coaching so that they can be the best they can be and enjoy it along the way.

In 2009, he expressed that he is looking for an opportunity to get involved with ZC to contribute more. He wants to coach which he really loves and if he is needed to play, he is more than willing as he thinks that he is enough fit and ready to do so. He thinks that he has still got a lot to offer as a player.

He was involved in teaching at St. John's Prep School in the sports department. He coaches at Lilfordia School, where Alistair Campbell and his father are also heavily involved. He has also opened a business about life skills and goal setting.

At the end of October 2009, he left his school teaching.

References

External links
 

1972 births
Living people
Cricketers from Bulawayo
White Zimbabwean sportspeople
Alumni of Falcon College
Zimbabwe Test cricketers
Zimbabwe One Day International cricketers
Zimbabwean cricketers
Mashonaland cricketers
Cricketers at the 1996 Cricket World Cup